Merosargus abana is a species of soldier fly in the family Stratiomyidae.

Distribution
Brazil.

References

Stratiomyidae
Insects described in 1932
Diptera of South America
Taxa named by Charles Howard Curran
Endemic fauna of Brazil